The 1948 Davidson Wildcats football team was an American football team that represented Davidson College during the 1948 college football season as a member of the Southern Conference. In their first year under head coach Lefty Jamerson, the team compiled an overall record of 3–5–1, with a mark of 2–5 in conference play, and finished in 12th place in the SoCon.

Schedule

References

Davidson
Davidson Wildcats football seasons
Davidson Wildcats football